Geoffrey Pryor (born 1944 in Canberra) is a retired Australian political cartoonist. He was the editorial cartoonist for The Canberra Times newspaper between 1978 and 2008. During this 30-year career, Pryor generally drew seven cartoons per week for the newspaper. Pryor's style was influenced by his predecessor at The Canberra Times, Larry Pickering. His graphic style is ornate, much more detailed and portrait-like than that of such contemporaries as Patrick Cook. He was cartoonist for The Saturday Paper until his "second retirement" in December 2018.

Reference sources
 Portrait of Geoff Pryor, cartoonist by Virginia Wallace-Crabbe, 1997
 Interview with Geoff Pryor, cartoonist (sound recording) interviewed by Ann Turner, 1998

References

External links
 Pryor collection of cartoons and drawings - held and digitised by the National Library of Australia
 Engaging insight into the nation's past: Geoff Pryor / Old Parliament House
 Engaging insight into the nation's past: Pickering and Pryor / Old Parliament House
 Cartoonist Pryor retiring after 30 yrs / ABC News

Australian editorial cartoonists
People from the Australian Capital Territory
1944 births
Living people
The Canberra Times people